Honeydripper is a 2007 American musical drama film written and directed by John Sayles.

Plot
Filmed and set in Georgiana, Alabama circa 1950, the film stars Danny Glover as the owner of a traditional blues club that is failing and in danger of being taken over until he hires a young electric guitarist (Gary Clark, Jr.) to stand-in as the popular "Guitar Sam" in the hopes of attracting a younger crowd. The film also stars musician Keb' Mo' as a mysterious blind guitarist, actor/comedian Kel Mitchell and singer Mable John. Rhythm and blues singer Ruth Brown recorded some songs for the film and was cast to play the role ultimately played by John, but died before filming started.

Cast

 Danny Glover as Tyrone "Pine Top" Purvis
 Lisa Gay Hamilton as Delilah
 Yaya DaCosta as China Doll
 Charles S. Dutton as Maceo
 Vondie Curtis-Hall as Slick
 Gary Clark, Jr. as Sonny Blake
 Mable John as Bertha Mae
 Stacy Keach as Sheriff Pugh
 Nagee Clay as Scratch

 Absalom Adams as Lonnie
 Arthur Lee Williams as Metalmouth Sims
 Ruben Santiago-Hudson as Stokely
 Davenia McFadden as Nadine 
 Daryl Edwards as Shack Thomas
 Sean Patrick Thomas as Dex
 Keb' Mo' as Possum
 Kel Mitchell as Junebug
 Mary Steenburgen as Amanda Winship

Reception

Critical response
Stephen Holden, the film critic for The New York Times, was disappointed in the film script and wrote, "While operating on a mythic level Honeydripper also wants to create the same kind of top-to-bottom social microcosm found in many of Mr. Sayles’s films. But this time his attempt to have his characters be simultaneously symbolic and real works at cross purposes. He is so uncomfortable writing dialogue in an old-time Southern argot that the conversations in Honeydripper rarely settle into the easy, colorfully idiomatic flow that has always been a hallmark of Southern speech. Hard as they try to break through the stiffness, the film’s fine actors only fitfully succeed in camouflaging the machinery behind their characters."

John Anderson, film critic for Variety magazine, liked the film, and lauded the musical in his review. He wrote, "John Sayles the storyteller and John Sayles the political progressive haven't always played well together, but, in the endearing musical time-piece Honeydripper, the indie icon lets his narrative gifts take the lead and the social issues follow like a tight bass line. The result is one of Sayles' best films. The music, a mix of blues, seminal rock and newcomer Gary Clark Jr.'s performance, will be an obvious draw, as will the performances by some leading African-American actors."

Critic Kirk Honeycutt was uncomfortable with the stereotypes in the film but praised it due to Sayles' film background.  He wrote, "...the film makes you at times uncomfortable with black and Southern stereotypes that may hinder some from fully enjoying an otherwise benign and cheerful tall tale of the Saturday night when rock came to rural Alabama. Sayles has paid far too many dues as a man who can write smoothly and in depth about many regions of America for a critical response to attack him over this. But the images and caricatures of a blind guitar picker, redneck sheriff, revival meetings, cotton-picking, fights in juke joints and the like have all been evoked in so many movies of much less integrity that this is a thing one must get past before surrendering to his amusing backwater fable.... The film does feature a host of interesting characters and, as always with Sayles, the dialogue has more than a few zingers. The well-cast actors are all solid, more than solid even, but as the director-editor Sayles lets the pace slacken too often."

Honeydripper won the 2008 NAACP Image Award for Outstanding Independent Motion Picture.

Distribution
Honeydripper had its world premiere on September 10 at the 2007 Toronto International Film Festival. It also screened at the San Sebastián International Film Festival, the London Film Festival, the St. Louis International Film Festival and the San Joaquin Film Festival.

The film had a limited release in the United States on December 28, 2007, with a release in the United Kingdom set for April 28, 2008.

References

External links
 
 
 
 John Sayles interview at GreenCine by Cathleen Rountree
 
 
 

2007 films
2000s musical drama films
Films directed by John Sayles
Films set in Alabama
Films set in 1950
Films shot in Alabama
African-American musical drama films
Blues films
Films with screenplays by John Sayles
Films scored by Mason Daring
2007 drama films
2000s English-language films
2000s American films